Todea papuana, the Papuan king fern is a species of fern known only from Papua-New Guinea. It is a rather large species up to 2 m (7 feet) tall, with sporangia borne on the leaves.

References

Osmundales
Ferns of Australasia
Flora of New Guinea
Plants described in 1968